Society (foaled April 12, 2019) is an American Thoroughbred racehorse who has won multiple graded stakes events as a three-year-old in 2022 including the Grade I Cotillion Stakes at Parx Racing.

Background
Society is a chestnut filly that was bred in Kentucky by Peter E. Blum Thoroughbreds. Her sire is Gun Runner, the 2017 American Horse of the Year and stands at Three Chimneys Farm. Society became the sixth grade 1 winner, and fourth grade 1 winner in 2022 for Gun Runner in his second-crop. Her dam is Etiquette who was also bred by Peter Blum, is a daughter of Tapit and is a half sister to Pleasant Prince who won the Grade III Ohio Derby and was second in the 2010 GI Florida Derby. Her offspring include a filly by Street Sense sold to Windancer Farm for $725,000 at the Keeneland September Yearling Sale. In 2022 Etiquette was covered once again by Gun Runner.

Society is trained by U.S. Racing Hall of Fame trainer Steven M. Asmussen.

Career

2021: Two-year-old season
Society began her racing career on October 21 in a Maiden Special Weight event over  furlongs at Keeneland. In a field of ten only one entrant had experience. Starting as a 27/1 longshot bumped Hypersport at the start then chased the early pace. Racing in the three path along the turn, was in the four path into the straight, rallied down the stretch, passing Hypersport and cleared in the final stages to win by a margin of a length in a time of 1:17.73. Society only had the one start in 2021.

2022: Three-year-old season
Society had a long spell of over 6 months and did not begin here three-year-old season until May 6. Returning in an Allowance Optional Claiming at Churchill Downs over  furlongs Society came out from the gate and soon went to the front. She was challenged by Ontheonesandtwos in the stretch run but repelled the challenge and moved ahead to win  lengths in a time of 1:16.89. 

On June 16 Society ran at Churchill Downs in the Monomoy Girl Overnight Stakes over a longer distance of  miles which attracted a small field of five. Society started as the 7/10 odds-on favorite again moved to the lead shortly after the start. With  mile to run Society withstood Miss Yearwood's advances and held to win by  a length in a time of 1:45.05.

Connections decided to challenge the best three-year-old fillies and on July 23 entered Society in the Grade 1 Coaching Club American Oaks at Saratoga Race Course. This event attracted Grade 1 Kentucky Oaks winner Secret Oath and Nest winner of the Grade 1 Ashland Stakes and runner-up in the Kentucky Oaks. Unfortunately, Society stumbled at the start and never recovered finishing a distant fourth to Nest. 

Five weeks later, Society ran in the Grade 2 Charles Town Oaks over a shorter distance of 7 furlongs. Society started as the 7/5 favorite pressed by Louisiana-bred star Free Like a Girl through a :23.28 first quarter and :46.54 half-mile. Society found a second wind turning for home, opening up four lengths at the top of the stretch winning by a final margin of  lengths in a stakes record time of 1:23.42. Jockey Tyler Gaffalione spoke to TVG after the race, "Society is naturally very fast and I just didn't want to get in her way. The first time I rode her going two turns (Coaching Club American Oaks) I got into a bit of a fight with her and she didn't finish up with me that well that day. So I learned from my mistakes. She's a very talented filly."

On September 24 Society entered the Grade 1 Cotillion Stakes at Parx Racing. In the field of nine entrants Society was made the 8/1 fourth choice. Society started well and moved to the lead unchallenged with an opening quarter in :23.33 and half-mile in :46.75. Heading into the turn for home, jockey Florent Geroux widened Society's lead with little effort to six lengths, hitting the six-furlong marker in 1:10.93 and finishing in 1:42.94,  lengths in front of longshot Morning Matcha with Secret Oath in third. Florent Geroux commented after the race, "I know if I kept her relaxed (I would win)."

On November 5 in the Breeders' Cup Distaff Society started slightly over 9/2 as third choice. Society led early but she was no match for Malathaat who won in a three-way photo finish with Blue Stripe and Clairiere finishing third.

Statistics

An (*) asterisk after the odds means Society was the post-time favorite.

Pedigree

References

2019 racehorse births
Racehorses bred in Kentucky
Racehorses trained in the United States
Thoroughbred family 3-l
American Grade 1 Stakes winners